Robert McFadden (January 19, 1923 – January 7, 2000) was an American singer, impressionist, and voice-over actor perhaps best known for his many contributions to animated cartoons.

His most popular television cartoon characters included Milton the Monster from the ABC series The Milton The Monster Show; Cool McCool from the NBC series Cool McCool; and Snarf from the syndicated series ThunderCats.

McFadden was also the voice behind numerous radio and television commercial parts including Franken Berry in the animated commercials for the General Mills Franken Berry cereal as well as the pet parrot who cackled "ring around the collar" in the TV commercials for Wisk laundry detergent.

Musical career
While in the United States Navy during World War II, he began performing as a singer and impressionist. After the war, he went on to work at a steel mill in Pittsburgh, Pennsylvania, and continued performing nights as an opening act for artists such as Harry Belafonte. In 1959, he appeared as a singer with folk music artist Rod McKuen on the Brunswick Records album entitled Songs Our Mummy Taught Us which included the two tracks, "The Mummy" and "The Beat Generation", also released as a single. "The Beat Generation" was later used by Richard Hell as the basis for his song "Blank Generation".

Voice acting
When McFadden moved to New York City after his work in Pittsburgh, he obtained extensive voice-over work in both commercials and animation. He was featured on the best-selling 1962 Vaughn Meader comedy LP The First Family

In 1963, McFadden released the Audio Fidelity Records parody album entitled Fast, Fast, Fast Relief From TV Commercials followed by the 1968 Columbia Records spoken-word album The Medium Is the Massage. In 1977, McFadden voiced Chugs the Train in the animated Rankin/Bass Easter special The Easter Bunny Is Comin' To Town.

Roles

Movies and TV specials

1966 – The Soupy Sales Hour – Various Roles 
1967 – The Wacky World of Mother Goose – Additional Voices 
1972 – The Enchanted World of Danny Kaye: "The Emperor's New Clothes" – Jasper
1974 – The Year Without a Santa Claus – Jingle Bells, Additional Voices
1977 – The Easter Bunny Is Comin' to Town – Chugs 
1979 – Rudolph and Frosty's Christmas in July – Additional Voices 
1980 – Pinocchio's Christmas – Cricket  
1981 – The Berenstain Bears Easter Special – Boss Bunny
1982 – The Flight of Dragons – Sir Orrin Neville-Smythe/Gorbash The Dragon 
1985 – The Life & Adventures of Santa Claus – Tingler 
1985 – ThunderCats – Lynx-O/Snarf/Slithe 
1987 – The Wind in the Willows – Magistrate

TV
1964 – Linus the Lionhearted – Loveable Truly, Rory, So-Hi
1965 – Astronut – Astronut/Oscar
1965–1966 – Milton the Monster – Various Roles
1966 – Cool McCool – Cool McCool/Dr. Madcap/Harry McCool
1966 – Journey to the Bottom of the Sea – Invader
1972–1973 – ABC Afternoon Superstar Movies – Barron Von Frankenstein/Additional Voices
1980 – Drawing Power – Additional Voices
1983 – The Coneheads – Louie Boucher
1980 – Gnomes – Kostya the Gnome
1980 – I Go Pogo – Howland Owl/Bothered Bat
1985–1989 – ThunderCats – Snarf/Ma-Mutt/Slithe/Driller/Grune The Destroyer/Tug-Mug/Topspinner/Snarfer/Wolo/Mole Master/Two Time/Polly/Quick Pick/Char/Dr. Dometone/Captain Bragg/Giantors/Bundun/Living Ooze/Burnout/Charr-Nin/Dirge/Enflamer/Micrit Leader/Mad Bubbler/Maftet/Mongor/Mr. Grubber/Mule/Screwloose/Terator/Zaxx/Tuskas/Trollog/Thunderian Guard/Captain Shiner/Guard/Cave Dweller
1986 – Silverhawks – Commander Stargazer/Steelwill/Yesman/Hardware/Condor/Flashback

Shorts

1966 – Haunted Housecleaning – Oscar 
1966– The Defiant Giant – George the Giant 
1966 – Scuba Duba Do – Fennimore 
1966 – Va-Room Service – Additional Voices
1966 – Mighty Heroes – Oscar/Gadmouse 
1967 – The Squawk Peg – Geronimo/Say-Ah the Medicine Man/Foback/Big Yawn  
1967 – Clean Sweep – Policeman/Repairman 
1967 – Mouse Trek – Cat 
1967 – The Fuz – The Cat 
1967 – Judos Kudos – Sad Cat/Fennimore/Lenimore 
1968 – Grand Prix Winner – Sad Cat/Fennimore/Lenimore/Super Ego/Announcer 
1968 – All Teed Off – Fennimore 
1968 – The Abominable Mountaineers – Fennimore 
1968 – Loops and Swoops – Sad Cat/Fennimore/Lenimore 
1969 – Scientific Sideshow – Oscar 
1969 – Balloon Snatcher – Oscar 
1970 – The Proton Pulsator – Oscar/Gadmouse   
1971 – Oscar's Birthday Present – Oscar
1974 – 'Twas the Night Before Christmas – Substation Operator, Councilmen, Handyman
1976 – The Little Drummer Boy Book II – Additional Voices
1977 – The Four Kings – Beaver 
1981 – The Leprechaun Christmas Gold – Additional Voices

Later life
McFadden continued to work until the late 1980s, when he was forced to retire due to failing health. On January 7, 2000, he died in Delray Beach, Florida, at the age of 76.

References

External links

1923 births
2000 deaths
Beat Generation people
American male voice actors
People from Leonia, New Jersey
Deaths from motor neuron disease
Neurological disease deaths in Florida
People from East Liverpool, Ohio
20th-century American male actors
20th-century American singers
20th-century American male singers
United States Navy personnel of World War II